Billy Luther is a Native American Independent film producer and director producing documentaries and short films.  He currently belongs to the Navajo, Hopi, and Laguna Pueblo Tribes.  He is best known for his documentary Miss Navajo which tells the story about woman competing in the beauty pageant of Miss Navajo.

Early life 
He belongs to the Navajo, Hopi, and the Laguna Pueblo tribes.  Luther began studying film work at Columbia College Chicago before moving east where he went to Hampshire College in Amherst, Massachusetts.

Career 
Billy Luther Began directing and making short films as a student at Hampshire College in Amherst Massachusetts.  One of these films included Face Value, which was a short documentary on racial profiling.

Miss Navajo (2007)

Miss Navajo was Billy Luther's first documentary film he directed. It was produced and distributed by Independent Lens, a series of the PBS channel. It premiered at the 2007 Sundance Film Festival. The film premiered at the 2007 Sundance Film Festival and traveled around the world at over 300 festivals. It continues to be taught in schools, colleges, and universities around the world.

Grab (2011)

Grab was Luther's Second major documentary film which premiered at the 2011 Sundance Film Festival.  The film tells the story about the Laguna ceremonial practice of giving.  Grab gives the audience views into the lives of the families who have pledged to gift and help the community. These families toss food, cultural items, and other goodies from the roof of their house to the participants below to "grab". Grab was narrated by actress Parker Posey.

Rebel Music : Native America (2015)

Luther co-directed the Native American episode of MTV World's Rebel Music. The episode was launched online – through Facebook – and became MTV's highest viewed online content in their history. Rebel Music The series was executive produced by acclaimed artist and activist Shepard Fairey, who also created the visual identity. REBEL MUSIC examines the lives of young people using art and music to spark change around the world.

Red Lake (2016)

Luther directed and produced a short documentary film about a high school shooting on the Red Lake Indian Reservation in northern Minnesota. The film follows three survivors as they reunite 10 years after the tragic event. The 30 minute film premiered at the 2016 Los Angeles Film Festival and was nominated for Best Short Film at the 2016 International Documentary Association (IDA) Awards.

alter-Native – 2 seasons – (2018–2019)

The webseries produced by ITVS, PBS and World of Wonder followed Naive fashion designer Bethany Yellowtail on her journey to create a line inspired by women on the front lines of political activism. The second season, also known as alter-Native: Kitchen followed three Native and Hawaiian chefs who return to their traditional foods from their communities to modernize them for the next generation.

Future Work 
In October 2020, It was announced in Variety that Oscar winner Taika Waititi had joined as Executive Producer on Luther's feature narrative debut as writer/director on Frybread Face and Me.

References 

Living people
Hampshire College alumni
Columbia College Chicago alumni
People from Winslow, Arizona
Native American filmmakers
American documentary filmmakers
Laguna Pueblo
Navajo people
Hopi people
Year of birth missing (living people)
21st-century Native Americans